Arthur Annesley may refer to:
 Arthur Annesley, 1st Earl of Anglesey (1614–1686), Anglo-Irish royalist statesman, succeeded as 2nd Viscount Valentia
 Arthur Annesley, 4th Baron Altham (1689–1727), grandson of the 1st Earl of Anglesey, a claim was made against his brother Richard as successor
 Arthur Annesley, 5th Earl of Anglesey (1678–1737), Anglo-Irish Tory politician, succeeded as 6th Viscount Valentia
 Arthur Annesley, 1st Earl of Mountnorris (1744–1816), British peer, succeeded as 8th Viscount Valentia
 Arthur Annesley (1760–1841), British politician and MP for Oxford, father of the 10th Viscount Valentia
 Arthur Annesley, 10th Viscount Valentia (1785–1863), descendant of the 1st Viscount Valentia
 Arthur Annesley, 11th Viscount Valentia (1843–1927), British politician and Comptroller of the Household, grandson of the 10th Viscount Valentia
 Arthur Noël Grove Annesley (born 1941), British auctioneer, honorary chairman of Christie's.